Manuel Vilas (born 1962) is a Spanish writer. He has achieved distinction in several genres, including poetry, essays, short stories and novels. His novel Alegría was a finalist for the Premio Planeta while an earlier book Ordesa won the Prix Femina Étranger.

He teaches at the University of Iowa.

References

21st-century Spanish writers
University of Iowa faculty
Living people
Year of birth missing (living people)
Prix Femina Étranger winners